Jake Michael Brown (born 21 November 1985) is a former Australian cricketer.

Brown is a right-handed batsman and a left-arm fast-medium bowler who played five first-class, one List A and one T20 matches for South Australia between 2008 and 2013. Playing for Kensington, he has won the Bradman Medal for the best player in the Adelaide first-grade competition three times: in 2013–14, 2014–15 and 2018–19.

References

External links
 

1985 births
Living people
South Australia cricketers
Australian cricketers